Qaleh Now District is in Ray County, Tehran province, Iran. The capital of the district is the village of Qaleh Now-e Khaleseh. At the 2006 National Census, the region's population (as a part of Kahrizak District) was 33,115 in 8,139 households. The following census in 2011 counted 29,072 people in 7,582 households. At the latest census in 2016, the district had 38,009 inhabitants in 8,147 households, by which time Qaleh Now District had been established.

References 

Ray County, Iran

Districts of Tehran Province

Populated places in Tehran Province

Populated places in Ray County, Iran